Allam is a surname. Notable people with the surname include: 

 Abdul Qadir al-Allam (1919–2003), Libyan politician
 Ahmad Allam-Mi (born 1948), Chadian diplomat
 Ahmed Issam Allam (born 1931), Egyptian gymnast
 Andrew Allam (1655–1685), English writer
 Assem Allam (born 1939), Egyptian businessman
 Boumedienne Allam (born 1979), French-Algerian rugby player
 Dalia Allam (born 1980), Egyptian synchronized swimmer
 Hannah Allam (born 1977), American journalist and reporter
 Hassan Allam (1903–1976), Egyptian builder
 Ibrahim Allam, Egyptian paralympic shot putter
 Jeff Allam (born 1954), British racing driver
 Magdi Allam (born 1952), Egyptian journalist and writer
 Mohamed Abdel Khalek Allam (1921–2011), Egyptian diver
 Mohamed Nasr Eldin Allam, Egyptian engineer
 Najla' Jalal Al Sayyed Allam, Egyptian writer and researcher
 Nida Allam (born 1993), American politician
 Peter Allam (born 1959), British sailor
 Rodney John Allam (born 1940), English chemical engineer
 Roger Allam (born 1953), English actor
 Shawki Allam (born 1961), 19th Grand Mufti of Egypt
 Abraam Allam (born 1991),Egyptian Chemist